Drosera tentaculata is a carnivorous plant native to Brazil. The species is endemic to the Brazil and occurs in "rupestre" field at the "Cadeia do Espinhaço" Highlands in the Bahia and Minas Gerais''.

See also
List of Drosera species
Taxonomy of Drosera

References

External links

tentaculata
Endemic flora of Brazil
Flora of Bahia
Flora of Minas Gerais
Flora of the Atlantic Forest
Carnivorous plants of South America
Plants described in 2003